Honor Medal (ghirsebis medali) is an honor awarded by the government of Georgia. It was established in 1992.

Statute 
Established in 1992, the Honor Medal is awarded to Georgian citizens who actively participated in the revival of Georgia and devoted themselves to noble deeds.

Notable recipients
 Eter Tvaradze
 Miho Mosulishvili

See also
Orders, decorations, and medals of Georgia
Order of Queen Tamara (2009)

References 
 Georgian Law on Georgian State Awards

Democratic Republic of Georgia
Orders, decorations, and medals of Georgia (country)